The following is a list of notable businesspeople from New Zealand.

A
 Margaret Alcorn (1868–1967), interior designer and design store owner
 Mary Alcorn (1866–1928), interior designer and design store owner
 Sophia Anstice (1849–1926), dressmaker and draper
 Sir Ray Avery (born 1947), pharmaceutical scientist

B
 Norah Barlow (born 1957), former chief executive of Summerset Group
 Samuel Brown (1845–1909), Mayor of Wellington and merchant
 Alfred Buckland (1825–1903), auctioneer, farmer, businessman and landowner

C
 Sir John Logan Campbell (1817–1912), merchant, local politician, businessman, philanthropist, the Father of Auckland
 George Thomson Chapman (1824–1881), merchant, bookseller and publisher
 Percy Roderick Coleman (1897–1965), founder of Coleman motorcycle importing and distribution company
 Dame Trelise Cooper, fashion designer

D
 Thomas Wong Doo (1903–1963), merchant, interpreter, community leader
 Peri Drysdale (born 1953), founder of Untouched World and Snowy Peak clothing companies
 Rod Drury (born 1966), businessman

E
 Alfred Eady (1891–1965), music retailer, company director, benefactor

F
 Sir Michael Fay (born 1949), merchant banker
 Josiah Firth (1826–1897), flourmiller, politician, pastoralist, entrepreneur
 Ted Firth (1905–1978), manufacturer, aviator, military leader; co-founder of Firth Concrete
 Tony Firth (1907–1980), manufacturer, aviator, military leader; co-founder of Firth Concrete
 Gregory Fortuin, businessman and Race Relations Conciliator (2001–2002)

G
 Theresa Gattung, former chief executive of Telecom New Zealand (1993–2007)
 Elizabeth George (c.1814–1902), hotel owner

H
 Sir Jack Harris, 2nd Baronet (1906–2009), chief executive of Bing, Harris & Co.
 Graeme Hart (born 1955), New Zealand's richest businessman
 Murray Haszard (born 1954), entrepreneur and businessman
 Joseph Hatch (1837–1928), Invercargill businessman, "harvester" of penguins
 Keith Hay (1917–1997), builder, businessman, local politician, morals campaigner
 Harriet Heron (ca.1836–1933), hotel owner
 Michael Hill (born 1938), jeweller, businessman, golfer
 Dame Bronwen Holdsworth (born 1942), co-founder of Pultron Composites
 Dick Hubbard (born 1946), founder of Hubbards Foods and Mayor of Auckland (2004–2007)
 Christopher Peter Huljich (born 1950), entrepreneur and philanthropist
 Michael Huljich (born 1957), entrepreneur and philanthropist
 Paul Huljich (born 1952), author, entrepreneur and philanthropist

I
 Mary Jane Innes (1852–1941), brewery owner

J
 Sir Robert Jones, property tycoon, founder of New Zealand Party

K
 Henry Kelliher (1896–1991), businessman, publisher, art patron, credit reformer

L
 Johannes La Grouw (1913–2011), OBE and Business Hall of Fame, entrepreneur, philanthropist, co-founder of a revolutionary construction system (Lockwood)
 Robert Laidlaw (1885–1971), retailer, founder of FTC, the Farmers Trading Company
 Thomson Leys (1850–1924), journalist, editor, newspaper proprietor, philanthropist
 Sir John Luke (1858–1931), businessman, politician

M
 William Betts Mason (1865–1912), founder of W.B. Mason, born in New Zealand and emigrated to the US
 Flora MacKenzie (1902–1982), brothel owner and dressmaker
 Sir Roy McKenzie (1922–2007), retailer, philanthropist
 Sir James Mills (1847–1936), founder of the Union Company
 Jeremy Moon, businessman; founder of Icebreaker clothing
 Sam Morgan (born 1975), businessman; founder of Trade Me, an Internet-auction website
 Nick Mowbray, businessman; co-founder of ZURU, a toy manufacturer
 Simon Moutter, engineer, businessman
 Sir Arthur Myers (1867–1926), businessman, politician, philanthropist
 Douglas Myers (1938–2017), businessman, brewer

N
 Joseph Nathan (1835–1912), manufacturer, founded Joseph Nathan & Co. and Glaxo
 Sir Charles Norwood (1871–1966), businessman, philanthropist

P
 John Plimmer (1812–1905), businessman, has been called the "Father of Wellington"

R
 Thomas Russell (c. 1830–1904), lawyer, businessman, politician, financier, land speculator

S
 Marianne Smith (1851–1938), businesswoman, founder of Smith & Caughey's, community worker, philanthropist
 Sir Dryden Spring (born 1939), businessman

T
 Sir Angus Tait (1919–2007), businessman and electronics innovator
 Stephen Tindall (born 1951), retailer, founder of The Warehouse Group, a New Zealand department-store chain
 Matthew Tukaki (born 1974), businessman, ex-Officio Director of the United Nations Global Compact, CEO of the Sustain Group, a global social investment business

V
 Edward Earle Vaile (1869–1956), real estate agent, farmer, philanthropist

W
 Sir James Wallace (born 1937), businessman and arts patron
 Eric Watson (born 1959), businessman
 James Williamson (1814–1888), merchant, landowner, financier, speculator

Y
 Jack Yan (born 1972), publisher, designer and businessman

See also
 Lists of New Zealanders

References

Lists of businesspeople
Businesspeople